Paul Clohessy, OAM (born 11 November 1970) is an Australian vision impaired tandem cyclist. He was born in Perth, Western Australia. He represented Australia at the three Paralympic Games - 1992, 1996 and 2000. He was also an Australian Institute of Sport scholarship holder in 1997 and 2000 in cycling.

Paralympics 

He competed but did not win any medals in his first Paralympics Games at the 1992 Barcelona Games. At the 1996 Atlanta Games, he won a silver medal in the Men's Individual Pursuit Tandem open event with his cycling partner Eddy Hollands. At the 2000 Sydney Games, he won a gold medal in the Men's Sprint Tandem open event with his cycling partner Darren Harry, for which he received a Medal of the Order of Australia, and a bronze medal in the Men's 1 km Time Trial Tandem open event with Hollands.

References

20th-century Australian people
21st-century Australian people
Paralympic cyclists of Australia
Cyclists at the 1992 Summer Paralympics
Cyclists at the 1996 Summer Paralympics
Cyclists at the 2000 Summer Paralympics
Medalists at the 1996 Summer Paralympics
Medalists at the 2000 Summer Paralympics
Paralympic gold medalists for Australia
Paralympic silver medalists for Australia
Paralympic bronze medalists for Australia
Paralympic cyclists with a vision impairment
Australian Institute of Sport Paralympic cyclists
Recipients of the Medal of the Order of Australia
Cyclists from Perth, Western Australia
Visually impaired category Paralympic competitors
Australian blind people
1970 births
Living people
Australian male cyclists
Paralympic medalists in cycling